During the 1913–14 English football season, Brentford competed in the Southern League Second Division. Despite winning 13 of 15 matches in the first half of the season, a loss of form in a five-week spell from February through to April 1914 ended the club's chances of an immediate return to First Division.

Season summary

Brentford player-manager Dusty Rhodes faced a tough task ahead in the Bees' first season back in the Southern League Second Division since 1900–01, with the club's debt having risen to £5,000 (equivalent to £ in ) and the prospect of high expenses and reduced gate receipts from away matches due to 11 of the league's 16 clubs being located in Wales. As a result, the Southern League Management Committee paid a £100 subsidy to each of the five English clubs in the league. Of the previous season's professional players, only goalkeeper Ted Price, full backs Tommy Fells and Walter Spratt, centre half Frank Bentley and outside left Patsy Hendren were retained. Bill Smith, Frederick Chapple and Bob McTavish were sold for small fees, while left half Phil Richards elected to retire. In came half backs Tom McGovern, Bobby Jackson and forwards Charlie Elliott, Henry Simons, Joe Johnson and Tommy Clark. England international amateur right half Alec Barclay remained with the club and amateur forwards Henry White and Jack Chapman were added to the ranks.

As the season got underway, Brentford feasted on poor Welsh opposition, winning 13 of the first 15 matches of the season, scoring 49 goals and conceding just three. Treharris and Ton Pentre were each beaten 7–0 at Griffin Park and the Bees also posted 5–0, 4–0 and 3–0 scorelines, each on two occasions. The rot slowly set in after a 1–0 home defeat to 2nd-place Croydon Common on Christmas Day 1913 and injuries and the absence of some of the club's amateurs lead to defeats to fellow challengers Luton Town in February 1914, Stoke later that month and a galling 1–0 reverse to Ton Pentre on 21 March. Defeat to Newport County at home on 4 April ended Brentford's mathematical chances of a runners-up finish and later that month, with the club unable to pay its players in full, leading scorer Henry Simons and future England international Jack Cock were sold to raise funds. Brentford finished the campaign in 4th-place and lost £127 for the season (equivalent to £ in ).

League table

Results
Brentford's goal tally listed first.

Legend

Southern League Second Division

FA Cup

 Source: 100 Years Of Brentford

Playing squad 
Players' ages are as of the opening day of the 1913–14 season.

 Sources: 100 Years Of Brentford, Football League Players' Records 1888 to 1939

Coaching staff

Statistics

Appearances and goals

Players listed in italics left the club mid-season.
Source: 100 Years Of Brentford

Goalscorers 

Players listed in italics left the club mid-season.
Source: 100 Years Of Brentford

Amateur international caps

Management

Summary

Transfers & loans

References 

Brentford F.C. seasons
Brentford